Bowling competitions at the 2021 Southeast Asian Games took place at Royal City Hanoi in Hanoi, Vietnam from 16 to 19 May 2022.

Medal table

Medalists

Men

Women

References

Bowling
2021